Madrid is a city and municipality in the Western Savanna Province, part of the department of Cundinamarca, Colombia. The city's main and biggest industry is the growing of flowers, especially roses which are mostly exported to the United States and Japan. Madrid borders Bojacá, El Rosal, Facatativá, Funza, Mosquera, Sibaté, Soacha, Subachoque, Tabio and Tenjo.

Etymology 
Madrid is named after its founder; Pedro Fernández Madrid.

History 
The area of Madrid was inhabited early in the history of inhabitation of the Bogotá savanna, evidenced by archaeological findings at Lake La Herrera (Lake Herrera). The Muisca inhabited the area before the Spanish conquest and had rich agricultural lands established in the region.

Modern Madrid was founded on June 7, 1559.

Madrid is well known because it harbors the Academy of Subofficers (non-commissioned officers) of the Colombian Air Force. The main highway to Medellín (also known as "variante") bisects the city and leads to the northern part of Colombia from Bogotá. In 2017 the town was featured in an episode of Madrid de sol a sol, a show from Spanish public channel Telemadrid exploring locations named "Madrid".

Economy 
Madrid has some other industries as manufacturing, retail stores and food processing. Some new business developments such as the Celta trade park are undergoing constructions. Such places are intended to be used as a reception point to the arrival of imported goods that will be later allowed to enter Bogota. Nearby towns such as Funza and Mosquera are related to this particular project.

Gallery

References 

Municipalities of Cundinamarca Department
Populated places established in 1559
1559 establishments in the Spanish Empire
Muisca Confederation